Arthur Clifford "Hi" Ladd (February 9, 1870 – May 7, 1948) was an outfielder in Major League Baseball. He played for the Pittsburgh Pirates and Boston Beaneaters in 1898. Arthur is the great great grandfather of current NHL player Andrew Ladd

External links

1870 births
1948 deaths
Major League Baseball outfielders
Pittsburgh Pirates players
Boston Beaneaters players
Fall River Indians players
Charleston Seagulls players
Paterson Giants players
Worcester Farmers players
Newark Colts players
Derby Angels players
Bridgeport Orators players
19th-century baseball players
Baseball players from Connecticut
Woonsocket (minor league baseball) players